António José Cardoso Mendes (born 12 March 1979), commonly known as Tozé Mendes, is a Portuguese football coach. He is currently head coach of Malta national under-19 football team.

Coaching career 

He took charge of Vitória Guimarães U19 from 2015 to 2019. After that, he became the manager for Vitória Guimarães U23 from 2019 to 2020. After gaining experience in Portugal, he continued his coaching career in Malta, where he was manager of Valetta from 2019 to 2022. Shortly after that, he became manager of the Malta national under-19 football team from 2022 until now.

Managerial statistics

References 

Vitória S.C. managers
Living people
Expatriate football managers in Portugal
1979 births